The 1990 Georgia Bulldogs baseball team represented the University of Georgia in the 1990 NCAA Division I baseball season. The Bulldogs played their home games at Foley Field. The team was coached by Steve Webber in his 10th season at Georgia.

The Bulldogs won the College World Series, defeating the Oklahoma State Cowboys in the championship game.

Roster

Schedule 

! colspan=2 style="background:black;color:white;"| Regular season
|-

|- align="center" bgcolor="ddffdd"
| at  || 10-2 || 1–0 || –
|- align="center" bgcolor="ffdddd"
| at Jacksonville || 5-6 || 1–1 || –
|- align="center" bgcolor="ddffdd"
| at  || 9-2 || 2–1 || –
|- align="center" bgcolor="ffdddd"
| at Georgia Southern || 4-8 || 2–2 || –
|- align="center" bgcolor="ffdddd"
| Jacksonville || 1-3 || 2–3 || –
|- align="center" bgcolor="ddffdd"
| Jacksonville || 6-0 || 3–3 || –
|- align="center" bgcolor="ddffdd"
| Georgia Southern || 3-1 || 4–3 || –
|- align="center" bgcolor="ddffdd"
| Georgia Southern || 10-2 || 5–3 || –
|- align="center" bgcolor="ddffdd"
|  || 14-4 || 6–3 || –
|- align="center" bgcolor="ffdddd"
| Wake Forest || 8-13 || 6–4 || –
|- align="center" bgcolor="ddffdd"
| Wake Forest || 13-2 || 7–4 || –
|- align="center" bgcolor="ddffdd"
|  || 14-6 || 8–4 || –
|- align="center" bgcolor="ddffdd"
| at  || 5-1 || 9–4 || –
|- align="center" bgcolor="ddffdd"
| at Central Florida || 7-2 || 10–4 || –
|- align="center" bgcolor="ddffdd"
|  || 6-4 || 11–4 || –
|- align="center" bgcolor="ddffdd"
| Campbell || 10-2 || 12–4 || –
|- align="center" bgcolor="ddffdd"
|  || 13-6 || 13–4 || –
|- align="center" bgcolor="ddffdd"
| Old Dominion || 16-9 || 14–4 || –
|- align="center" bgcolor="ddffdd"
|  || 13-1 || 15–4 || –
|- align="center" bgcolor="ddffdd"
| Virginia || 8-2 || 16–4 || –
|- align="center" bgcolor="ddffdd"
| Virginia || 12-3 || 17–4 || –
|- align="center" bgcolor="ddffdd"
| Virginia || 11-6 || 18–4 || –
|- align="center" bgcolor="ddffdd"
| at  || 4-2 || 19–4 || 1-0
|- align="center" bgcolor="ddffdd"
| at Kentucky || 3-2 || 20–4 || 2-0
|- align="center" bgcolor="ffdddd"
| at Kentucky || 2-7 || 20–5 || 2-1
|- align="center" bgcolor="ddffdd"
|  || 14-2 || 21–5 || 3-1
|- align="center" bgcolor="ddffdd"
| Auburn || 7-0 || 22–5 || 4-1
|- align="center" bgcolor="ddffdd"
| Auburn || 11-10 || 23–5 || 5-1
|- align="center" bgcolor="ddffdd"
|  || 8-5 || 24–5 || –
|- align="center" bgcolor="ddffdd"
| Clemson || 9-8 || 25–5 || –
|- align="center" bgcolor="ffdddd"
| at  || 1-5 || 25–6 || 5-2
|- align="center" bgcolor="ffdddd"
| at Vanderbilt || 2-7 || 25–7 || 5-3
|- align="center" bgcolor="ddffdd"
| at Vanderbilt || 12-11 || 26–7 || 6-3
|- align="center" bgcolor="ddffdd"
| at  || 20-2 || 27–7 || –
|- align="center" bgcolor="ddffdd"
|  || 8-5 || 28–7 || 7-3
|- align="center" bgcolor="ddffdd"
| Tennessee || 13-4 || 29–7 || 8-3
|- align="center" bgcolor="ddffdd"
| Tennessee || 3-2 || 30–7 || 9-3
|- align="center" bgcolor="ddffdd"
|  || 9-8 || 31–7 || –
|- align="center" bgcolor="ddffdd"
| at  || 9-2 || 32–7 || 10-3
|- align="center" bgcolor="ddffdd"
| at Alabama || 4-3 || 33–7 || 11-3
|- align="center" bgcolor="ddffdd"
| at Alabama || 11-9 || 34–7 || 12-3
|- align="center" bgcolor="ddffdd"
| Western Carolina || 12-11 || 35–7 || –
|- align="center" bgcolor="ddffdd"
| Western Carolina || 15-3 || 36–7 || –
|- align="center" bgcolor="ddffdd"
|  || 6-4 || 37–7 || 13-3
|- align="center" bgcolor="ddffdd"
| Florida || 4-3 || 38–7 || 14-3
|- align="center" bgcolor="ffdddd"
| Florida || 1-4 || 38–8 || 14-4
|- align="center" bgcolor="ddffdd"
| Augusta College || 15-2 || 39–8 || –
|- align="center" bgcolor="ffdddd"
| at Georgia Tech || 2-8 || 39–9 || –
|- align="center" bgcolor="ddffdd"
| at  || 9-0 || 40–9 || 15-4
|- align="center" bgcolor="ddffdd"
| at Mississippi State || 12-1 || 41–9 || 16-4
|- align="center" bgcolor="ffdddd"
| at Mississippi State || 6-22 || 41–10 || 16-5
|- align="center" bgcolor="ddffdd"
| Georgia Tech || 8-6 || 42–10 || –
|- align="center" bgcolor="ffdddd"
| at Georgia Tech || 5-12 || 42–11 || –
|- align="center" bgcolor="ddffdd"
|   || 6-1 || 43–11 || 17-5
|- align="center" bgcolor="ffdddd"
| Mississippi  || 2-7 || 43–12 || 17-6
|- align="center" bgcolor="ddffdd"
| Mississippi  || 15-4 || 44–12 || 18-6
|- align="center" bgcolor="ffdddd"
| at   || 2-11 || 44–13 || 18-7
|- align="center" bgcolor="ffdddd"
| at LSU  || 2-5 || 44–14 || 18-8
|- align="center" bgcolor="ffdddd"
| at LSU  || 5-8 || 44–15 || 18-9
|-

|-
! style="background:black;color:white;"| Post-Season
|-

|- align="center" bgcolor="ffdddd"
| May 17 || vs. Vanderbilt || Hoover Metropolitan Stadium || 3-6 || 44-16
|- align="center" bgcolor="ffdddd"
| May 18 || vs. Florida || Hoover Metropolitan Stadium || 5-6 || 44-17
|-

|- align="center" bgcolor="ddffdd"
| May 25 || vs. Connecticut || Municipal Stadium || 7-2 || 45–17
|- align="center" bgcolor="ddffdd"
| May 26 || vs.  || Municipal Stadium || 6-3 || 46–17
|- align="center" bgcolor="ddffdd"
| May 27 || vs.  || Municipal Stadium || 5-4 || 47–17
|- align="center" bgcolor="ffdddd"
| May 28 || vs.  || Municipal Stadium || 3-4 || 47–18
|- align="center" bgcolor="ddffdd"
| May 28 || vs. Rutgers || Municipal Stadium || 20-9 || 48–18
|-

|- align="center" bgcolor="ddffdd"
| June 1 || vs. Mississippi State || Rosenblatt Stadium || 3–0 || 49–18
|- align="center" bgcolor="ddffdd"
| June 3 || vs. Stanford || Rosenblatt Stadium || 16–2 || 50–18
|- align="center" bgcolor="ffdddd"
| June 6 || vs. Stanford || Rosenblatt Stadium || 2–4 || 50–19
|- align="center" bgcolor="ddffdd"
| June 8 || vs. Stanford || Rosenblatt Stadium || 5–1 || 51–19
|- align="center" bgcolor="ddffdd"
| June 9 || vs. Oklahoma State || Rosenblatt Stadium || 2–1 || 52–19
|-

Awards and honors 
Dave Fleming
 All-America Third Team
 College World Series All-Tournament Team

Brian Jester
 All-America Second First Team

Stan Payne
 Freshman All-American

Doug Radziewicz
 College World Series All-Tournament Team

Mike Rebhan
 College World Series Most Outstanding Player

J.R. Showalter
 All-America Second First Team

Ray Suplee
 Freshman All-American

Bulldogs in the 1990 MLB Draft 
The following members of the Georgia Bulldogs baseball program were drafted in the 1990 Major League Baseball Draft.

References 

Georgia Bulldogs
Georgia Bulldogs baseball seasons
College World Series seasons
NCAA Division I Baseball Championship seasons
Georgia Bulldogs baseball
Georgia